Elizabeth Jean "Betsy" Reitz is a zooarchaeologist and Professor Emerita in the Georgia Museum of Natural History and the Department of Anthropology at the University of Georgia. She was born in 1946 in Lake Alfred, Florida. She attended Florida Presbyterian College (now Eckerd College) from 1966 to 1967. She received her BA (1969), MA (1975), and her PhD (1979) in Anthropology from the University of Florida. Her dissertation was directed by Elizabeth Wing. In 2012, she was elected a Fellow of the American Association for the Advancement of Science, and in 2014, she was named to the American Academy of Arts and Sciences. She was the recipient of the 2016 Fryxell Award for Interdisciplinary Research in Archaeology, given by the Society for American Archaeology. The Fryxell Award is given to scholars who have made significant contributions in the application of the zoological sciences in archaeology. She is a member of the Committee of Honor of the International Council for Zooarchaeology (ICAZ). In 2019, Reitz was awarded the Southeastern Archaeological Conference's Lifetime Achievement Award.

"Reitz has worked throughout Latin America, the Caribbean, and the southeastern United States, studying vertebrate remains from coastal archaeological sites dating from the late Pleistocene era into the 20th century." Her work includes collaborations with local residents of areas in which she is working as well as overseeing a large (over 4200 specimen) zooarchaeological collection in the Georgia Museum of Natural History.

A reviewer for the Canadian Journal of Archaeology praised Reitz and Wing's book, Zooarchaeology as "the best available introductory text on the subject for undergraduate students".

She has been credited for having "done more than any other individual to advance the subfield of historical zooarchaeology".

Lyman notes that she is a "vocal advocate for using bone weight allometry as a measure of taxonomic abundance".

Selected publications

References

External links
Faculty page

American archaeologists
American women archaeologists
University of Georgia faculty
Zooarchaeologists
Fellows of the American Association for the Advancement of Science
Fellows of the American Academy of Arts and Sciences
Living people
Year of birth missing (living people)
American women academics
21st-century American women